Hydroxybutanal may refer to:

 3-Hydroxybutanal, an aldol, formerly used in medicine as a hypnotic and sedative
 4-Hydroxybutanal, a chemical intermediate

See also
 Hydroxybutyraldehyde

Aldehydes
Sedatives